A tie down strap (also known as a ratchet strap, a lashing strap or a tie down) is a fastener used to hold down cargo or equipment during transport.  Tie down straps are essentially webbing that is outfitted with tie down hardware.  This hardware allows the tie down strap to attach to the area surrounding the cargo or equipment, loop over the cargo or equipment, and/or attach to the cargo or equipment.  It usually also includes a method of tensioning the strap, such as a ratchet.

Common types
Two common types of tie-down straps are loop straps and two-piece straps.

Loop straps are a single piece of webbing that is looped around the item to be protected and the two endpoints are brought together at the tie-down fastener for fastening and providing tension.

A two-piece tie-down strap is a single assembly that is constructed out of two separate pieces of webbing each with their own hardware that is fastened at one end to the area surrounding the equipment to be protected and connected to each other, typically at the fastener.

Webbing with a linking device is used for the fastening of goods with trucks, trailers, pallets, boxes, and containers. This is also known as ratchet lashing, ratchet straps, ratchet tie downs, tie down straps and lashing with webbing.

Custom ratchet straps can have hooks such as J hooks, D hooks, E track fittings, and with S hooks being the most popular industry-standard.

See also
 Trucker's hitch
Load securing
Strapping
Webbing

References

Fasteners